William Larry Stewart II (March 24, 1937 – January 17, 1970) was an American rhythm and blues singer and pianist who was popular during the 1960s.

Biography
Stewart was 12 years old when he began singing with his younger brothers Johnny, James, and Frank as the Four Stewart Brothers, and they later went on to get their own radio show every Sunday for five years at WUST in Washington, D.C. He was a graduate of Armstrong High School, now Friendship Armstrong Academy.

Stewart made the transition to secular music by filling in occasionally for the Rainbows, a D.C. area vocal group led by the future soul star, Don Covay. It was through the Rainbows that Stewart met another aspiring singer, Marvin Gaye. Rock and roller Bo Diddley has been credited with discovering Stewart playing piano in Washington, D.C. and inviting him to be one of his backup musicians.

By 1955, this led to a recording contract with Diddley's label, Chess Records and Diddley played guitar on Stewart's 1956 recording of "Billy's Blues". A strong seller in Los Angeles, "Billy's Blues" reached the sales top 25 in Variety magazine. Stewart then moved to Okeh Records and recorded "Billy's Heartache", backed by the Marquees, another D.C. area group which featured Marvin Gaye.

Back at Chess in the early 1960s, Stewart began working with A&R man Billy Davis. He recorded a song called "Fat Boy" and then had additional success with his recordings of "Reap What You Sow" and "Strange Feeling", both making the Billboard Hot 100 and the Top 30 in the R&B charts.

Major chart success was not far away and in 1965, Stewart recorded two self-written songs, "I Do Love You" (No. 6 R&B, No. 26 Pop), which featured his brother Johnny Stewart as one of the backing vocalists with his partner James English, and "Sitting in the Park" (No. 4 R&B, No. 24 Pop). His idiosyncratic improvisational technique of doubling-up, scatting his words and trilling his lips made his style unique in the 1960s.

In 1966, Stewart recorded the LP Unbelievable. The first single released from that album was Stewart's radical interpretation of the George Gershwin song, "Summertime", a Top 10 hit on both the pop and R&B charts.

The follow-up single was Stewart's cover version of the Doris Day hit "Secret Love", which reached the Pop Top 30 and just missed the Top 10 on the R&B chart. Stewart continued to record throughout the remainder of the 1960s on Chess without major success.  A weight problem worsened, and he developed diabetes. Stewart suffered minor injuries in a motorcycle accident in 1969.

Health and death
Stewart's weight caused him several health problems, culminating in diabetes, a condition that may have contributed to his motorcycle accident in 1969.

He died in a broad-daylight car accident in January 1970, at age 32. The accident happened when the Ford Thunderbird that Stewart was driving approached a bridge across the Neuse River near Smithfield, North Carolina (presumably on Interstate 95). His car left the highway, ran along the median strip at a slight angle to the highway, struck the bridge abutment, and then plunged into the river, killing Stewart and his three passengers instantly. The other victims in the accident were members of Stewart's band: Norman P. Rich, 39, of Washington, D.C.; William Cathey, 32 of Charlotte, N.C.; and Rico Hightower, 22 of Newark, New Jersey. The four musicians were driving to a nightclub show in Columbia, South Carolina at the time of the wreck. The car had been purchased only 12 days before and had been driven only 1,400 miles before the accident occurred.

Stewart was buried in National Harmony Memorial Park in Landover, Maryland.

Lawsuit and trial
Sarah Stewart, the executrix of his estate, sued Ford Motor Company on behalf of his estate, claiming mechanical failure was the cause of the accident. The first trial was won by Ford Motor Company, but on appeal the court ruled that the trial court's refusal to give the requested jury instructions was in error and ordered the case reversed and remanded. The case was then settled out of court.

Musical legacy
During the late 1970s and early 1980s, his music was popular among Latino, specifically Chicano, youth on the West Coast. Stewart was inducted into the Washington Area Music Association Hall of Fame in 2002.

His version of "Summertime" was one of the songs featured on Bob Dylan's Theme Time Radio Hour show, and was one of the few artists Dylan actually responded about during his mainly fictitious email responses to listener questions. His version of "Summertime" was also featured in the last scene and on the soundtrack of the 2003 movie Stuck on You. His musical legacy is also being kept alive by several talented family members in his hometown of Washington D.C. Cousins Grace Ruffin who is a member of the '60s group The Four Jewels, singer and musician Calvin C. Ruffin Jr. and local Washington, D.C. independent recording artist Dane Riley, continue to perform several of his hits during their concerts.

NRBQ has performed "Sitting In The Park" as a fluctuating part of their set list since 1970. Three versions have been released by NRBQ on CD.

In Quentin Tarantino's Once Upon a Time in Hollywood, Billy Stewart's "Summertime" is featured in a scene where Brad Pitt's character, Cliff Booth, leaves his home and erratically drives off into the twilight. Stewart was inducted into the class of 2021 for the National Rhythm & Blues Hall of Fame.

Discography

Singles
 Chess 1625: "Billy's Blues" / "Billy's Blues"
 Argo 5256: "Billy's Blues" / "Billy's Blues"
 Okeh 4-7095: "Baby, You're My Only Love" / "Billy's Heartache" (1957 with Bo Diddley, backed by The "Marquees")
 Chess 1820: "Reap What You Sow" / "Fat Boy" (1962) - #18 R&B, #79 pop
 Chess 1835: "True Fine Lovin'" / "Wedding Bells" (1962)
 Chess 1852: "Scramble" / "Oh My, What Can the Matter Be" (1963)
 Chess 1868: "Strange Feeling" / "Sugar and Spice" (1963) - #25 R&B, #70 pop
 Chess 1888: "A Fat Boy Can Cry" / "Count Me Out" (1964)
 Chess 1905: "Tell It Like It Is" / "My Sweet Senorita" (1964)
 Chess 1922: "I Do Love You" / "Keep Loving" (1965) - #6 R&B, #26 pop
 Chess 1932: "Sitting in the Park" / "Once Again" (1965) - #4 R&B, #24 pop
 Chess 1941: "How Nice It Is" / "No Girl" (1965)
 Chess 1948: "Because I Love You" / "Mountain of Love" (1965)
 Chess 1960: "Love Me" / "Why Am I Lonely" (1966) - #38 R&B
 Chess 1966: "Summertime" / "To Love, to Love" (1966) - #7 R&B, #10 pop
 Chess 1978: "Secret Love" / "Look Back and Smile" (1967) - #11 R&B, #29 pop
 Chess 1991: "Every Day I Have the Blues" / "Ol' Man River" (1967) - #41 R&B, #79 pop
 Chess 2002: "Cross My Heart" / "Why (Do I Love You So)?" (1968) - #34 R&B, #86 pop / #49 R&B
 Chess 2053: "Tell Me the Truth" / "What Have I Done?" (1968) - #48 R&B
 Chess 2063: "I'm In Love" / "Crazy 'Bout You, Baby" (1969)
 Chess 2080: "By the Time I Get to Phoenix" / "We'll Always Be Together"  (1969)

Albums
Chess 1496: I Do Love You (1965) (Billboard #97)
Chess 1499: Unbelievable (1966) (Billboard #138)
Chess 1513: Billy Stewart Teaches Old Standards New Tricks (1967)
Chess 1540: Cross My Heart (1969)
Chess 1547: Remembered (1970)
Sugar Hill/Chess CH-8401: The Greatest Sides (1982)

References

External links
 WAMA Hall of Fame
 
 "Singer Billy Stewart Dies In Car Crash-Plunge", Jet Magazine, 5 February 1970. Retrieved June 15, 2017.

1937 births
1970 deaths
20th-century African-American male singers
Burials at National Harmony Memorial Park
Chess Records artists
American male jazz musicians
Okeh Records artists
Road incident deaths in North Carolina
Scat singers
Singers from Washington, D.C.